The 2019 Women's Tour de Yorkshire was a two day cycling stage race staged in Yorkshire over 3 and 4 May 2019. It was the fourth edition of the Women's Tour de Yorkshire, organised by Welcome to Yorkshire and the Amaury Sport Organisation. It was the second time the race was organised as a stage race. For the first time, the race was live broadcast in full on ITV4 in 2019.

Route

Teams
Eighteen teams professional teams and a British national team, each with a maximum of six riders, participated in the race:

Classification leadership table

Stages

Stage 1

Stage 2

See also
 2019 in women's road cycling

References

External links

Official website

2019 in English sport
2019 in women's road cycling
Women
Tour
May 2019 sports events in the United Kingdom